Vivi–Benotto, known as Selle Italia–Chinol in 1982, was an Italian professional cycling team that existed from 1982 to 1983.

The team competed in the 1982 and 1983 Giro d'Italia.

Major wins
1983
 Giro d'Italia
 Young rider classification, Franco Chioccioli
Stage 14, Gregor Braun
 Giro di Sardegna, Gregor Braun
 Stage 1 Giro del Trentino, Franco Chioccioli

References

Defunct cycling teams based in Italy
1982 establishments in Italy
1983 disestablishments in Italy
Cycling teams established in 1982
Cycling teams disestablished in 1983